Gradefes is a municipality located in the province of León, Castile and León, Spain. , the municipality has a population of 1,076 inhabitants.

Sights include the all-female Cistercian monastery of Santa María la Real, founded  in 1177, the church of San Miguel de Escalada, the parish church of the Assumption (12th century, in the hamlet of Villarmún), and the ruined monastery of San Pedro de Eslonza.

References

Municipalities in the Province of León